Ochterus banksi is a species of velvety shore bug in the family Ochteridae. It is found in North America.

References

Further reading

 
 

Articles created by Qbugbot
Insects described in 1913
Ochteridae